Robert Lee Dunn (February 5, 1908 – May 27, 1971) was a pioneer Western swing steel guitarist. Influenced by influential Hawaiian lap steel guitar player Sol Hoʻopiʻi, Dunn played in his own original bluesy style and was one of the first to record an electric guitar, preceding other country & western guitarists following him shortly. He preceded by over three years George Barnes (with Big Bill Broonzy in 1938), Leonard Ware and, slightly later, Eddie Durham.

On January 27, 1935, Dunn became one of the first musicians to record an electrically amplified instrument as a member of Milton Brown and His Musical Brownies.

Dunn also played steel guitar in numerous other Western swing groups including those of Cliff Bruner and one of Moon Mullican's earlier bands. Dunn also had his own group, The Vagabonds, featuring Mullican and Cliff Bruner.

Dunn was inducted into the Steel Guitar Hall of Fame in 1992.

References

Bibliography
DeCurtis, Anthony. Present Tense: Rock & Roll and Culture. Duke University Press, 1992) 
Ginell, Cary. Milton Brown and the Founding of Western Swing. Urbana, IL: University of Illinois Press, 1994. 
Oliphant, Dave. "Texas Jazz: 1920-50". The Roots of Texas Music edited by Lawrence Clayton, Joe W. Specht, pp. 37–65. Texas A&M University Press, 2005.

External links
DUNN, ROBERT LEE (1908-1971)—Encyclopedia of Oklahoma History & Culture.
Dunn, Robert Lee (Bob)—Handbook of Texas Online.
 Bob Dunn recordings at the Discography of American Historical Recordings.

Western swing performers
Guitarists from Oklahoma
1908 births
1971 deaths
People from Braggs, Oklahoma
20th-century American musicians
American male guitarists
20th-century American guitarists
20th-century American male musicians